The history of General Motors (GM), one of the world's largest car and truck manufacturers, dates back more than a century and involves a vast scope of industrial activity around the world, mostly focused on motorized transportation and the engineering and manufacturing that make it possible. Founded in 1908 as a holding company in Flint, Michigan, as of 2012 it employed approximately 209,000 people around the world. With global headquarters at the Renaissance Center in Detroit, Michigan, United States, General Motors manufactures cars and trucks in 35 countries. In 2008, 8.35 million GM cars and trucks were sold globally under various brands. Current auto brands are Buick, Cadillac, Chevrolet, GMC, and Wuling. Former GM automotive brands include La Salle, McLaughlin, Oakland, Oldsmobile, Opel, Pontiac, Hummer, Saab, Saturn, Vauxhall, Daewoo and Holden.

In addition to brands selling assembled vehicles, GM also has had various automotive-component and non-automotive brands, many of which it divested in the 1980s through 2000s. These have included Euclid and Terex (earthmoving/construction/mining equipment and vehicles); Electro-Motive Diesel (locomotive, marine, and industrial diesel engines); Detroit Diesel (automotive and industrial diesel engines); Allison (Aircraft engines, transmissions, gas turbine engines); Frigidaire (Appliances including refrigeration and air conditioning); New Departure (bearings); Delco Electronics and ACDelco (electrical and electronic components); GMAC (finance); General Aviation and North American Aviation (airplanes); GM Defense (military vehicles) and Electronic Data Systems (information technology).

1908–1929

General Motors was capitalized by William C. Durant on September 16, 1908, as a holding company. The next day it purchased Buick Motor Company, and rapidly acquired more than twenty companies including Oldsmobile, Cadillac, Oakland Motor Car Company, and McLaughlin of Canada. Dr. Campbell, Durant's son-in-law, put 1,000,000 shares on the stock market in Chicago Buick (then controlled by Durant).

Durant's earlier company, the Durant-Dort Carriage Company, had been in business in Flint since 1886, and by 1900 was producing over 100,000 carriages a year in factories located in Michigan and Canada. Prior to his acquisition of Buick, Durant had several Ford dealerships. With springs, axles and other key components being provided to the early automotive industry by Durant-Dort, it can be reasoned that GM actually began with the founding of Durant-Dort.

GM under Durant's leadership acquired Oldsmobile later in 1908. The next year, he brought in Cadillac, Cartercar, Elmore, Ewing, and Oakland. In 1909, General Motors also acquired the Reliance Motor Car Company of Owosso, Michigan, and the Rapid Motor Vehicle Company of Pontiac, Michigan, the predecessors of GMC Truck. A Rapid became the first truck to conquer Pikes Peak in 1909. In 1910, Welch and Rainier were added to the ever-growing list of companies controlled by GM.

GM was initially created by combining independent manufacturers who were competing with the Ford Motor Company and vehicles offered before the October 1, 1908 introduction of the Model T. Once the Model T began to dominate the market, independent companies began to combine their resources as corporations and decided to offer what the Model T didn't. The Model T was offered in black because it dried the fastest as it rolled off the assembly line, so GM offered their products in various color combinations; the Model T came with one four-cylinder engine, so GM offered their vehicles with different wheelbases and engine displacements on a gradual scale based on price.

Durant lost control of GM in 1910 to a bankers trust as the deal to buy Ford for $8 million fell through, due to the large amount of debt (around $1 million) taken on in its acquisitions, while Samuel McLaughlin left at the same time. Durant was forced out of the firm by the stockholders and co-founded the Chevrolet Motor Company in 1911 with Louis Chevrolet. McLaughlin in 1915 built Chevrolet in Canada and after a stock buyback campaign with the McLaughlin and DuPont corporations, and other Chevrolet stock holders, Durant returned to head GM in 1916, as Chevrolet owned 54.5% with the backing of Pierre S. du Pont. On October 13 of the same year, GM Company incorporated as General Motors Corporation after McLaughlin merged his companies and sold his Chevrolet stock to allow the incorporation, which in turn followed the incorporation of General Motors of Canada (reverting to General Motors Company upon emergence from bankruptcy in 2009 that left General Motors of Canada Limited as a privately owned Canadian Company). Chevrolet entered the General Motors fold in 1918 as it became part of the Corporation with R S McLaughlin as Director and Vice-President of the Corporation; its first GM car was 1918's Chevrolet 490. Du Pont removed Durant from management in 1920, and various Du Pont interests held large or controlling shareholdings until about 1950.

In 1918 GM acquired the Chevrolet stock from McLaughlin Motor Car Company of Oshawa, Ontario, Canada, manufacturer of the McLaughlin automobile since 1907 (later to be renamed McLaughlin-Buick) as well as Canadian versions of Chevrolet cars since 1915. The company was renamed General Motors of Canada Ltd., with R.S. "Colonel Sam" McLaughlin as its first president and his brother George as vice-president allied with the Corporation 1919. Superior Court of Ontario Canada documents show the Corporation as indirect parent of General Motors of Canada Limited. General Motors of Canada is a 100% owned Canadian Company.

1918 also saw personnel increase at GM. The number of employees grew from about 49,000 workers to 85,000 workers. Many came from the South of the United States, as well as from Europe, to work at GM Michigan facilities. To accommodate them, GM began to build employee housing with the nearly $2.5 million set aside for the project. This would become one of General Motors top 5 expenditures for the year 1919. 1919 also brought changes to employee investment opportunities. Similar to modern-day 401(k) plans, all employees could invest a percentage of their wages or salary. GM proceeded to match every penny that their employees invested.

GM's headquarters were located in Flint until the mid-1920s, when they were moved to Detroit. Its building, originally to be called the Durant Building, was designed and began construction in 1919 when Durant was president, was completed in 1923. Alfred P. Sloan became president that year, and the building was officially dedicated as the General Motors Building in 1929. GM maintained this headquarters location, now called Cadillac Place, until it purchased the Renaissance Center in 1996. The Buick Division headquarters remained in Flint until 1998 when it was relocated to the Renaissance Center.

In 1920, Durant oversaw the start-up of the Sheridan line of cars, manufactured (from 1920 to 1921) in Muncie, Indiana. The Sheridan nameplate has the distinction of being the first automotive brand started from scratch by General Motors. When Buick's D. A. Burke approached Durant about the idea of designing a car from the ground up, and then marketing the car as a bridge vehicle between GM's established divisions of Chevrolet and Oakland (a four-cylinder), and between Buick and Cadillac (an eight-cylinder), respectively.

To market the vehicles, Sheridan hired World War I flying ace Eddie Rickenbacker, himself an accomplished automobile racer in his own right. Through prosaic marketing and Rickenbacker's endorsements, Sheridan officials felt the production target of 300 cars a day was not only achievable but profitable as well.

Just as production began to ramp up, Durant was fired for the second and final time from General Motors. Since the Sheridan was a Durant pet project, GM, now under Alfred Sloan, was left with Sheridan, one of Durant's more costly but viable caprices. Durant on the other hand knew that the vehicle was soundly engineered and knew what GM paid for the Muncie facility. In May 1921, Durant purchased the rights to the Sheridan and to the Muncie plant, with the intent on using the facility to continue building the Sheridan and Durant's new project, the Durant and Princeton automobiles, now to be built by Durant Motors.

In 1925, GM bought Vauxhall of England, and then in 1929 went on to acquire an 80% stake in German automobile manufacturer Opel. Two years later this was increased to 100%. In 1931, GM acquired Holden of Australia.

In 1926, GM created the Pontiac as a "companion" to the Oakland brand, an arrangement that lasted five years. The companion outsold its parent during that period, by so much that the Oakland brand was terminated and the division was renamed, Pontiac. As part of General Motors Companion Make Program, three other companion makes (Buick's Marquette, Oldsmobile's Viking, and Cadillac's LaSalle) were created. Each of these, however, had less staying power than Pontiac and was discontinued within a few years, due in large part to the Great Depression.

General Motors acquired control of the 'Hertz Drive-Ur-Self System' (now better known as The Hertz Corporation), the Yellow Cab Manufacturing Company together with its subsidiaries, Yellow Coach Manufacturing Company in 1926 from John D. Hertz who joined the mainboard (John Hertz purchased the car rental business back from GM in 1953 and took it public the following year). GM also acquired the Yellow Coach bus company, and helped create Greyhound bus lines.

During this period (and into the 30s), Sloan and his team established the practice of targeting each of GM's automotive divisions to a specific demographically and socio-economically identifiable market segment. Despite some shared components, each marque distinguished itself from its stablemates with unique styling and technology. The shared components and common corporate management created substantial economies of scale, while the distinctions between the divisions created (in the words of GM President Sloan) a "ladder of success", with an entry-level buyer starting out at the bottom with the "basic transportation" Chevrolet, then rising through Pontiac, Oldsmobile, Buick, and ultimately to Cadillac.

While Ford continued to refine the manufacturing process to reduce cost, Sloan was inventing new ways of managing a complex worldwide organization, while paying special attention to consumer demands. Car buyers no longer wanted the cheapest and most basic model; they wanted style, power, and prestige, which GM offered them. Sloan did not neglect cost, by any means; when it was proposed Chevrolet should introduce safety glass, he opposed it because it threatened profits. Thanks to consumer financing via GMAC (founded 1919), easy monthly payments allowed far more people to buy GM cars than Ford, as Henry Ford was opposed to credit on moral principles. (Nevertheless, Ford did offer similar credit arrangements with the introduction of the Model A in the late 1920s but Ford Credit did not exist until 1959.)

In 1929, General Motors acquired a 80% majority stake in Opel, making it the first non–American subsidiary of General Motors.

1929–1958

The 1930s

In 1930, GM entered aircraft design and manufacturing by buying Fokker Aircraft Corp of America (U.S. subsidiary of Fokker) and Berliner-Joyce Aircraft, merging them into General Aviation Manufacturing Corporation. Through a stock exchange GM took controlling interest in North American Aviation and merged it with its General Aviation division in 1933, but retaining the name North American Aviation. In 1948, GM divested NAA as a public company, never to have a major interest in the aircraft manufacturing industry again. GM did, however, establish their own air transportation, with the creation of the General Motors Air Transport Section (GMATS).

General Motors bought the internal combustion engined railcar builder Electro-Motive Corporation and its engine supplier Winton Engine in 1930, renaming both as the General Motors Electro-Motive Division.

In 1931, after purchasing remaining stake – General Motors took over the full control of Opel, making the company a wholly owned subsidiary, and over the next twenty years, diesel-powered locomotives—the majority built by GM—largely replaced other forms of traction on American railroads. (During World War II, these engines were also important in American submarines and destroyer escorts.) Electro-Motive was sold in early 2005.

In 1932, GM formed a new subsidiary—United Cities Motor Transport (UCMT)—to finance the conversion of streetcar systems to buses in small cities. From 1936 the company was involved in an unpublicized project, with others, in what became known as the General Motors streetcar conspiracy to buy out streetcar and intercity train transport operators using subsidiary companies, and convert their operations to use buses.

In 1935, the United Auto Workers labor union was formed, and in 1936 the UAW organized the Flint Sit-Down Strike, which initially idled two key plants in Flint, but later spread to half-a-dozen other plants including Janesville, Wisconsin and Fort Wayne, Indiana. In Flint, police attempted to enter the plant to arrest strikers, leading to violence; in other cities the plants were shuttered peacefully. The strike was resolved February 11, 1937, when GM recognized the UAW as the exclusive bargaining representative for its workers.

World War II

General Motors produced vast quantities of armaments, vehicles, and aircraft for the Allied war effort during World War II. Its multinational interests were split up by the combating powers during the war such that the American, Canadian and British parts of the corporation served the Allied war effort and Adam Opel AG served the Axis war effort. By the spring of 1939, the German Government had assumed day-to-day control of American owned factories in Germany, but decided against nationalizing them completely (seizing the assets and capital). Soon after the war broke out, the nationalization came.

General Motors ranked first among United States corporations in the value of wartime production contracts. GM's William S. Knudsen served as head of U.S. wartime production for President Franklin Roosevelt. The General Motors UK division, Vauxhall Motors, manufactured the Churchill tank series for the Allies. The Vauxhall Churchill tanks were instrumental in the UK campaigns in North Africa. Bedford Vehicles and GM of Canada, CMP manufactured 500,000 logistics vehicles for the UK military, all important in the UK's land campaigns. In addition to the obvious manufacture of motor vehicles for the Allied cause, GM was also a major manufacturer of aircraft.

By mainstream accounts, General Motors' German subsidiary (Adam Opel AG) was outside the control of the American parent corporation during World War II. Some historians posit that GM profiteered on both sides, but Alfred Sloan's memoir presents a description of lost control. However, GM found criticism for its tax avoidance around the Opel topic. During the war, GM declared it had abandoned its German subsidiary, and took a complete tax write-off worth "approximately $22.7 million", yet after the war, GM collected some $33 million in "war reparations" because the Allies had bombed its German facilities.

Post-war growth
At one point GM had become the largest corporation registered in the United States, in terms of its revenues as a percent of GDP. In 1953, Charles Erwin Wilson, then GM president, was named by Eisenhower as Secretary of Defense. When he was asked during the hearings before the Senate Armed Services Committee if as secretary of defense he could make a decision adverse to the interests of General Motors, Wilson answered affirmatively but added that he could not conceive of such a situation "because for years I thought what was good for the country was good for General Motors and vice versa". Later this statement was often misquoted, suggesting that Wilson had said simply, "What's good for General Motors is good for the country."

At the time, GM was one of the largest employers in the world—only Soviet state industries employed more people. In 1955, General Motors became the first American corporation to pay taxes of over $1 billion.

GM operated six divisions at this time, one of which (GMC) only sold trucks. The other five settled into a hierarchy, which consisted, from most- to least-prestigious, Cadillac, Buick, Oldsmobile, Pontiac and Chevrolet.

1958–1980
By 1958, the divisional distinctions within GM began to blur with the availability of high-performance engines in Chevrolets and Pontiacs. The introduction of higher trim models such as the Chevrolet Impala and Pontiac Bonneville priced in line with some Oldsmobile and Buick offerings was also confusing to consumers. By the time Pontiac, Oldsmobile and Buick introduced similarly styled and priced compact models in 1961, the old "step-up" structure between the divisions was nearly over. Earlier in the late 1920s, GM had introduced "junior" brands as a result of the General Motors companion make program as an attempt to bridge the pricing gap between the brands but the overlap and offering eight different brands had a similar confusing effect to consumers and was cancelled by 1930.

The decade of the 1960s saw the creation of compact and intermediate classes. The Chevrolet Corvair was a flat 6-cylinder (air cooled) response to the Volkswagen Beetle, the Chevy II was created to match Ford's conventional Falcon, after sales of the Corvair failed to match its Ford rival, and the Chevrolet Camaro/Pontiac Firebird was GM's countermeasure to the Ford Mustang. Among intermediates, the Oldsmobile Cutlass nameplate became so popular during the 1970s that Oldsmobile applied the Cutlass name to most of its products in the 1980s. By the mid-1960s, most of GM's vehicles were built on a few common platforms and in the 1970s GM began to further unify body panel stampings.

The 1971 Chevrolet Vega was GM's launch into the new subcompact class to compete against the import's increasing market share. Problems associated with its innovative aluminum engine led to the model's discontinuation after seven model years in 1977. During the late 1970s, GM would initiate a wave of downsizing starting with the Chevrolet Caprice which was reborn into what was the size of the Chevrolet Chevelle, the Malibu would be the size of the Nova, and the Nova was replaced by the troubled front-wheel drive Chevrolet Citation. In 1976, Chevrolet came out with the rear-wheel drive sub compact Chevette.

In 1974, GM was the first major automobile company to offer airbags as optional equipment in a non-experimental, unlimited vehicle capacity. Called the "Air Cushion Restraint System", the safety feature was optional on specific full-size Cadillac, Buick, and Oldsmobile vehicles. The occupant safety system proved an unpopular option and was discontinued after the 1976 model year not to return until the 1990s when federal mandates made the system a requirement.

While GM maintained its world leadership in revenue and market share throughout the 1960s to 1980s, it was product controversy that plagued the company in this period. It seemed that, in every decade, a major mass-production product line was launched with defects of one type or another showing up early in their life cycle. And, in each case, improvements were eventually made to mitigate the problems, but the resulting improved product ended up failing in the marketplace as its negative reputation overshadowed its ultimate excellence.

The first of these fiascos was the Chevrolet Corvair in the 1960s. Introduced in 1959 as a 1960 model, it was initially very popular. But before long its quirky handling eventually earned it the reputation for being unsafe, inspiring consumer advocate Ralph Nader to lambaste it in his book, Unsafe at Any Speed, published in 1965. Coincidentally, by the same (1965) model year, suspension modifications and other improvements had already transformed the car into a perfectly acceptable vehicle, but its reputation had been sufficiently sullied in the public's perception that its sales declined over the next few years, and it was discontinued after the 1969 model year. During this period, it was also somewhat overwhelmed by the success of the Ford Mustang.

The 1970s was the decade of the Vega. Launched as a 1971 model, it also began life as a very popular car in the marketplace. But within a few years, quality problems, exacerbated by labor unrest at its main production source in Lordstown, Ohio, gave the car a bad name. By 1977, its decline resulted in termination of the model name, while its siblings along with a Monza version and a move of production to Ste-Thérèse, Quebec, resulted in a thoroughly desirable vehicle and extended its life to the 1980 model year.

Oldsmobile sales soared in the 1970s and 1980s (for an all-time high of 1,066,122 in 1985) based on popular designs, positive reviews from critics and the perceived quality and reliability of the Rocket V8 engine, with the Cutlass series becoming North America's top selling car by 1976. By this time, Olds had displaced Pontiac and Plymouth as the #3 best-selling brand in the U.S. behind Chevrolet and Ford. In the early 1980s, model-year production topped one million units on several occasions, something only Chevrolet and Ford had achieved. The soaring popularity of Oldsmobile vehicles resulted in a major issue in 1977, as demand exceeded production capacity for the Oldsmobile V8, and as a result Oldsmobile quietly began equipping some full size Delta 88 models and the very popular Cutlass/Cutlass Supreme with the Chevrolet 350 engine instead (each division of GM produced its own 350 V8 engine). Many customers were loyal Oldsmobile buyers who specifically wanted the Rocket V8, and did not discover that their vehicle had the Chevrolet engine until they performed maintenance and discovered that purchased parts did not fit. This led to a class-action lawsuit which became a public relations nightmare for GM. Following this debacle, disclaimers stating that "Oldsmobiles are equipped with engines produced by various GM divisions" were tacked onto advertisements and sales literature; all other GM divisions followed suit. In addition, GM quickly stopped associating engines with particular divisions, and to this day all GM engines are produced by "GM Powertrain" (GMPT) and are called GM "Corporate" engines instead of GM "Division" engines. Although it was the popularity of the Oldsmobile division vehicles that prompted this change, declining sales of V8 engines would have made this change inevitable as all but the Chevrolet (and, later, Cadillac's Northstar) versions were eventually dropped.

In the 1980 model year, a full line of automobiles on the X-body platform, anchored by the Chevrolet Citation, was launched. Again, these cars were all quite popular in their respective segments for the first couple of years, but brake problems, and other defects, ended up giving them, known to the public as "X-Cars", such a bad reputation that the 1985 model year was their last. The J-body cars, namely the Chevrolet Cavalier and Pontiac Sunbird, took their place, starting with the 1982 model year. Quality was better, but still not exemplary, although good enough to survive through three generations to the 2005 model year. They were produced in a much-improved Lordstown Assembly plant, as were their replacements, the Chevrolet Cobalt and Pontiac Pursuit/G5.

1980–present
Roger B. Smith served as CEO throughout the 1980s. GM profits struggled from 1981 to 1983 following the late 1970s and early 1980s recession. In 1981, the UAW negotiated some concessions with the company in order to bridge the recession. GM profits rebounded during the 1980s. During the 1980s, GM had downsized its product line and invested heavily in automated manufacturing. It also created the Saturn brand to produce small cars. GM's customers still wanted larger vehicles and began to purchase greater numbers of SUVs. Roger Smith's reorganization of the company had been criticized for its consolidation of company divisions and its effect on the uniqueness of GM's brands and models. His attempts to streamline costs were not always popular with GM's customer base. In addition to forming Saturn, Smith also negotiated joint ventures with two Japanese companies (NUMMI in California with Toyota, and CAMI with Suzuki in Canada). Each of these agreements provided opportunities for the respective companies to experience different approaches.

The 1980s also marked the dismantling of General Motors' medium and heavy trucks, with imported Isuzu trucks taking over at the lighter end and with the heavy-duty business being gradually sold off to Volvo through a joint venture.

The decade of the 1990s began with an economic recession, taking its inevitable toll on the automotive industry, and throwing GM into some of its worst losses. As a result, "Jack" Smith (not related to Roger) became burdened with the task of overseeing a radical restructuring of General Motors. Sharing Roger's understanding of the need for serious change, Jack undertook many major revisions. Reorganizing the management structure to dismantle the legacy of Alfred P. Sloan, instituting deep cost-cutting and introducing significantly improved vehicles were the key approaches. These moves were met with much less resistance within GM than had Roger's similar initiatives as GM management ranks were stinging from their recent near-bankruptcy experience and were much more willing to accept the prospect of radical change.

Following the first Persian Gulf War and a recession GM's profits again suffered from 1991 to 1993. For the remainder of the decade the company's profits rebounded and it made market share gains with the popularity of its SUVs and pick-up truck lines. Rick Wagoner had served as the company's Chief Financial Officer during this period in the early 1990s. GM's foreign rivals gained market share especially following U.S. recessionary periods while the company recovered. U.S. trade policy and foreign trade barriers became a point of contention for GM and other U.S. automakers who had complained that they were not given equal access to foreign markets. Trade issues had prompted the Reagan administration to seek import quotas on some foreign carmakers. Later, the Clinton administration engaged in trade negotiations to open foreign markets to U.S. automakers with the Clinton administration threatening trade sanctions in efforts to level the playing field for U.S. automakers.

José Ignacio López de Arriortúa, who worked under Jack Smith in both Europe (particularly the successful turnaround of Opel) and the United States, was poached by Volkswagen in 1993, just hours before Smith announced that López would be promoted to head of GM's North American operations. He was nicknamed Super López for his prowess in cutting costs and streamlining production at GM, although critics said that his tactics angered longtime suppliers. GM accused López of poaching staff and misappropriating trade secrets, in particular taking documents of future Opel vehicles, when he accepted a position with VW. German investigators began a probe of López and VW after prosecutors linked López to a cache of secret GM documents discovered by investigators in the apartment of two of López's VW associates.
G.M. then filed suit in a United States District Court in Detroit, using part of the Racketeer Influenced and Corrupt Organizations Act, which left VW open to triple damages (billions of dollars) if the charges were proved in court. VW, faced with a plummeting stock price, eventually forced López to resign. GM and Volkswagen since reached a civil settlement, in which Volkswagen agreed to pay GM $100 million and to buy $1 billion worth of parts from GM.

After GM's lay-offs in Flint, Michigan, a strike began at the General Motors parts factory in Flint on June 5, 1998, which quickly spread to five other assembly plants and lasted seven weeks. Because of the significant role GM plays in the United States, the strikes and temporary idling of many plants noticeably showed in national economic indicators.

In the early 1990s, following the first Gulf War and a recession, GM had taken on more debt. By the late 1990s, GM had regained market share; its stock had soared to over $80 a share by 2000, peaking at $93.63 a share on April 28 and $50 billion capitalization. However, in 2001, the stock market drop following the September 11, 2001 attacks, combined with historic pension underfunding, caused a severe pension and benefit fund crisis at GM and many other American companies and the value of their pension funds plummeted.

Production of SUVs and trucks vs. cars
In the late 1990s, the U.S. economy was on the rise and GM and Ford gained market share producing enormous profits primarily from the sale of light trucks and sport-utility vehicles.

In 2001, following the September 11th attacks, a severe stock market decline caused a pension and benefit fund underfunding crisis.
GM began its Keep America Rolling campaign, which boosted sales, and other auto makers were forced to follow suit. The U.S. automakers saw sales increase to leverage costs as gross margins deteriorated.

In 2004, GM redirected resources from the development of new sedans to an accelerated refurbishment of their light trucks and SUVs for introduction as 2007 models in early 2006. Shortly after this decision, fuel prices increased by over 50% and this in turn affected both the trade-in value of used vehicles and the perceived desirability of new offerings in these market segments. The current marketing plan is to tout these revised vehicles extensively as offering the best fuel economy in their class (of vehicle). GM claims its hybrid trucks will have fuel economy improvements of 25%.

Corporate restructuring and operating losses

After gaining market share in the late 1990s and making enormous profits, General Motors stock soared to over $80 a share. From June 1999 to September 2000, the Federal Reserve, in a move to quell potential inflationary pressures created by, among other things, the stock market, made successive interest rate increases, credited in part for putting the country into a recession. The recession and the volatile stock market created a pension and benefit fund crisis at General Motors and many other American companies. General Motors' rising retiree health care costs and Other Post Employment Benefit (OPEB) fund deficit prompted the company to enact a broad restructuring plan. Although GM had already taken action to fully fund its pension plan, its OPEB fund became an issue for its corporate bond ratings. GM had expressed its disagreement with the bond ratings; moreover, GM's benefit funds were performing at higher than expected rates of return. In 2003, GM responded to the crisis by fully funding its pension fund with a $15 B payment; however, its Other Post Employment Benefits Fund (OPEB) became a serious issue resulting in downgrades to its bond rating in 2005. Then, following a $10.6 billion loss in 2005, GM acted quickly to implement its restructuring plan.

GM began its Keep America Rolling campaign, which boosted sales, and other automakers were forced to follow suit. The U.S. automakers saw sales increase to leverage costs as gross margins deteriorated. For the first quarter of 2006, GM earned $400 million, signaling that a turnaround had already begun even though many aspects of the restructuring plan had not yet taken effect. Although retiree health care costs remain a significant issue, General Motors' investment strategy has generated a $17.1 billion surplus in 2007 in its $101 billion U.S. pension fund portfolio, a $35 billion reversal from its $17.8 billion of underfunding.

In February 2005, GM successfully bought itself out of a put option with Fiat for $2 billion USD (€1.55 billion). In 2000, GM had sold a 6% stake to Fiat in return for a 20% share in the Italian automaker. As part of the deal, GM granted Fiat a put option, which, if the option had been exercised between January 2004 and July 2009, could have forced GM to buy Fiat. GM had agreed to the put option at the time, perhaps to keep it from being acquired by another automaker, such as DaimlerChrysler, competing with GM's German subsidiary Opel. The relationship suffered and Fiat had failed to improve. In 2003, Fiat recapitalized, reducing GM's stake to 10%.

In 2006, GM had begun to apply the Mark of Excellence, which was actually the GM logo. GM had stopped putting their logo on the cars in 2009, but GM did apply the GM logo on some of the early 2010 GM models.

In February 2006, GM slashed its annual dividend from $2.00 to $1.00 per share. The reduction saved $565 million a year. In March 2006, GM divested 92.36 million shares (reducing its stake from 20% to 3%) of Japanese manufacturer Suzuki, in order to raise $2.3 billion. GM originally invested in Suzuki in the early 1980s.

On March 23, 2006, a private equity consortium including Kohlberg Kravis Roberts, Goldman Sachs, and Five Mile Capital purchased 78% of GMAC's (now Ally Financial) commercial mortgage arm, then called Capmark, for $8.8 billion.

On April 3, 2006, GM announced that it would sell 51% of GMAC (now Ally Financial) as a whole to a consortium led by Cerberus Capital Management, raising $14 billion over three years. Investors also included Citigroup's private equity arm and Aozora Bank of Japan. The group will pay GM $7.4 billion in cash at closing. GM will retain approximately $20 billion in automobile financing worth an estimated $4 billion over three years.

GM sold its remaining 8% stake in Isuzu, which had peaked at 49% just a few years earlier, on April 11, 2006, to raise an additional $300 million. 12,600 workers from Delphi, a key supplier to GM, agreed to buyouts and an early retirement plan offered by GM in order to avoid a strike, after a judge agreed to cancel Delphi's union contracts. 5,000 Delphi workers were allowed to flow to GM.

In 2006, GM offered buyouts to hourly workers to reduce future liability; over 35,000 workers responded to the offer, well exceeding the company's goal. GM gained higher rates of return on its benefit funds as a part of the solution. Stock value began to rebound—as of October 30, 2006, GM's market capitalization was about $19.19 billion. GM stock began the year 2006 at $19 a share, near its lowest level since 1982, as many on Wall Street figured the ailing automaker was bound for bankruptcy court. But GM remained afloat and the company's stock in the Dow Jones industrial average posted the biggest percentage gain in 2006.

In June 2007, GM sold its military and commercial subsidiary, Allison Transmission, for $5.6 billion. Having sold off the majority, it will, however, keep its heavy-duty transmissions for its trucks marketed as the Allison 1000 series.

During negotiations for the renewal of its industry labor contracts in 2007, the United Auto Workers (UAW) union selected General Motors as the "lead company" or "strike target" for pattern bargaining. Late in September, sensing an impending impasse in the talks, the union called a strike, the first nationwide walkout since 1970 (individual plants had experienced local labor disruptions in the interim). Within two days, however, a tentative agreement was achieved and the strike ended.

On June 28, 2007, GM agreed to sell its Allison Transmission division to private equity firms Carlyle Group and Onex for $5.1 billion. The deal will increase GM's liquidity and echoes previous moves to shift its focus towards its core automotive business. The two firms will control seven factories around Indianapolis but GM will retain management of a factory in Baltimore. Former Allison Transmission president Lawrence E. Dewey will be the new CEO of the standalone company.

Kirk Kerkorian once owned 9.9 percent of GM. According to press accounts from June 30, 2006, Kerkorian suggested that Renault acquire a 20 percent stake in GM to rescue GM from itself. A letter from Tracinda (Kerkorian's investment vehicle) to Rick Wagoner was released to the public to pressure GM's executive hierarchy, but talks failed. On November 22, 2006, Kerkorian sold 14 million shares of his GM stake (it is speculated that this action was due to GM's rejection of Renault and Nissan's bids for stakes in the company as both of these bids were strongly supported by Kerkorian); the sale resulted in GM's share price falling 4.1% from its 20 November price, although it remained above $30/share. The sale lowered Kerkorian's holding to around 7% of GM. On November 30, 2006, Tracinda said it had agreed to sell another 14 million shares of GM, cutting Kerkorian's stake to half of what it had been earlier that year. By the end of November 2006, he had sold substantially all of his remaining GM shares. After Kerkorian sold, GM lost more than 90% of its value, falling as low as $1/share by May 2009.

On February 12, 2008, GM announced its operating loss was $2 billion (with a GAAP loss of $39 billion including a one time accounting charge). GM offered buyouts to all its UAW members.

On March 24, 2008, GM reported a cash position of $24 billion, or $6 billion less than what was on hand September 31, 2007, which is a loss of $1 billion a month. A further quarterly loss of $15.5 billion, the third-biggest in the company's history, was announced on August 1, 2008.

On November 17, 2008, GM announced it would sell its stake in Suzuki Motor Corp. (3.02%) for 22.37 billion yen ($230 million) in order to raise much needed cash to get through the 2008 economic crisis.

In 2008, 8.35 million GM cars and trucks were sold globally under the brands Vauxhall, Buick, Cadillac, Chevrolet, GMC, GM Daewoo, Holden, Pontiac, Hummer, Saab, Saturn, Wuling and Opel of Germany.

Great Recession and Chapter 11 reorganization

In late 2008 GM, along with Chrysler, received loans from the American, Canadian, and Ontarian governments to bridge the late-2000s recession, record oil prices, and a severe global automotive sales decline (see also automotive industry crisis of 2008–2009) due to the global financial crisis of 2008–2009. On February 20, 2009, GM's Saab division filed for reorganization in a Swedish court after being denied loans from the Swedish government.

On April 27, 2009, GM announced that it would phase out the Pontiac brand by the end of 2010 and focus on four core brands in North America: Chevrolet, Cadillac, Buick, and GMC. It announced that the resolution (sale) of its Hummer, Saab, and Saturn brands would take place by the end of 2009. (By November, however, proposed deals to sell Saturn to Penske and Saab to Koenigsegg had failed to materialize.) The company had closed its Oldsmobile division in 2004.

In 2009, GM had renamed itself as General Motors Company, creating its former appellation: General Motors Corporation.

On May 30, 2009, it was announced that a deal had been reached to transfer GM's Opel assets to a separate company, majority-owned by a consortium led by Sberbank of Russia (35%), Magna International (20%), and Opel employees (10%). GM was expected to keep a 35% minority stake in the new company. However, GM delayed acceptance of the deal pending other bids, notably a proposed 51% stake by Beijing Automotive. By early July, a decision had not been made, but Magna remained confident and scheduled a meeting for July 14 to announce its acceptance. After months of deliberation, however, GM decided on November 3, 2009, to retain full ownership of the German carmaker Opel, thus voiding the tentative deal with the Magna consortium.

In June 2010, the company established General Motors Ventures, a subsidiary designed to help the company identify and develop new technologies in the automotive and transportation sectors.

In 2012, PSA Peugeot Citroën and General Motors formed an alliance, which involved General Motors acquiring seven percent of the PSA Group. The ownership was soon divested on December 13, 2013, generating "gross proceeds of €0.25 billion". By 2017, Groupe PSA considered taking over Opel from GM, after GM reported a loss of $257 million from its European operations in 2016, the sixteenth consecutive loss-making year for GM in Europe, bringing its total losses in Europe since 2000 to more than US$15 billion. On March 6, 2017, the sale of Opel and Vauxhall to the PSA Group for $2.3 billion was confirmed.

History of General Motors in various countries

General Motors in South Africa

General Motors was criticized for its presence in apartheid South Africa. The company withdrew after pressure from consumers, stockholders and Leon H. Sullivan.
It retained a commercial presence, however, in the form of its Opel subsidiary. Right Hand Drive Opel & Vauxhall production took place in GM's Uitenhage plants outside Port Elizabeth in the Eastern Cape Province, and does so to this day.

General Motors in Argentina

In 1925 General Motors settled down in Argentina and started producing the Double Phaeton standard and the Double Phaeton called "Especial Argentino". The production was completed with a sedan model, a roadster and a truck chassis also adaptable to transporting of passengers. Sales increased and soon the Oldsmobile, Oakland and Pontiac brands were incorporated into the assembly line; the capacity of the facility was not enough to supply the increasing demand and the building of a new plant was required. A new 48,000 m2 plant with a covered area was opened in 1929, and since then the Buick, Marquette, La Salle, Cadillac, Vauxhaul and Opel marques also started to be produced.

When the Second World War broke out the operations were complicated. In 1941, 250,000 Chevrolets were made, but shortage of parts made car production impossible. The last Chevrolet left the plant in August, 1942. though in order to avoid total stoppage, the company made electrical and portable refrigerators and car accessories in addition to other items. After the war, GM started producing the Oldsmobile and Pontiac lines and later Chevrolet was added.

Production resumed in 1960 with Chevrolet pickups and shortly thereafter in 1962 it started assembling the first/second generation Chevy II until 1974 as Chevrolet 400, and the early third-generation (1968 model) Nova as the Chevrolet Chevy from late 1969 through 1978, both models overlapping for several years, the Chevy II marketed as a family sedan while the Nova as a sporty alternative. Thenceforth several Opel models and Chevrolet pickups are being manufactured.

Corporate spin-offs

Electronic Data Systems Corporation

In 1984, GM acquired Electronic Data Systems Corporation (EDS), a leading data processing and telecommunications company, to be the sole provider of information technology (IT) services for the company. EDS became independent again in 1996, signing a 10-year agreement to continue providing IT services to General Motors.

Delco Electronics Corporation
Delco Electronics Corporation was the automotive electronics design and manufacturing subsidiary of General Motors.

The name Delco came from the Dayton Engineering Laboratories Co., founded in Dayton, Ohio by Charles Kettering and Edward A. Deeds.

Delco was responsible for several innovations in automobile electric systems, including the first reliable battery ignition system and the first practical automobile self starter.

In 1936 Delco began producing the first dashboard-installed car radios. By the early 1970s Delco had become a major supplier of automotive electronics equipment. Based in Kokomo, Indiana, Delco Electronics employed more than 30,000 at its peak.

In 1962 GM created the General Motors Research Laboratories, based in Santa Barbara, California, to conduct research and development activities on defense systems. This organization was eventually merged into Delco Electronics and renamed Delco Systems Operations.

In 1985 General Motors purchased Hughes Aircraft and merged it with Delco Electronics to form Hughes Electronics Corporation, an independent subsidiary. In 1997 all of the defense businesses of Hughes Electronics (including Delco Systems Operations) were merged with Raytheon, and the commercial portion of Delco Electronics was transferred to GM's Delphi Automotive Systems business. Delphi became a separate publicly traded company in May 1999, and continued to use the Delco Electronics name for several of its subsidiaries through approximately 2004.

Although Delco Electronics no longer exists as an operating company, GM still retains rights to the Delco name and uses it for some of its subsidiaries including the AC Delco parts division.

Hughes Electronics Corporation

Hughes Electronics Corporation was formed on December 31, 1985, when Hughes Aircraft Company was sold by the Howard Hughes Medical Institute to General Motors for $5.2 billion. General Motors merged Hughes Aircraft with its Delco Electronics unit to form Hughes Electronics Corporation, an independent subsidiary. This division was a major aerospace and defense contractor, civilian space systems manufacturer and communications company. The aerospace and defense business was sold to Raytheon in 1997 and the Space and Communications division was sold to Boeing in 2000. Hughes Research Laboratories became jointly owned by GM, Raytheon, and Boeing. In 2003, the remaining parts of Hughes Electronics were sold to News Corporation and renamed The DirecTV Group.

Delphi Corporation

Delphi was spun off from General Motors on May 28, 1999. Delphi is one of the largest automotive parts manufacturers and has approximately 185,000 employees (50,000 in the United States). With offices worldwide, the company operates 167 wholly owned manufacturing sites, 41 joint ventures, 53 customer centers and sales offices, and 33 technical centers in 38 countries. Delphi makes the Monsoon premium audio systems found in some GM and other manufacturer automobiles.

On October 8, 2005, Delphi filed for Chapter 11 bankruptcy. On March 31, 2006, Delphi announced it would sell off or close 21 of its 29 plants in the United States.

Diesel engines
Detroit Diesel was originally the GM Diesel Division then Detroit Diesel Allison Division until 1988. It made diesel engines for truck, generating set and marine use.

Electro-Motive Diesel (EMD) was originally the Electro-Motive Division of GM, until 2005. It made diesel engines and locomotives.

See also General Motors Diesel Division and GM Defense.

General Motors Acceptance Corporation
By the end of 2006, GM had completed the divestiture of 51% of its financing unit, GMAC. Currently GM is a 10% owner in GMAC.

General Motors leadership

Chairmen of the Board of General Motors
Chairmen of the Board of General Motors

Thomas NealNovember 19, 1912 – November 16, 1915
Pierre S. du PontNovember 16, 1915 – February 7, 1929
Lammot du Pont IIFebruary 7, 1929 – May 3, 1937
Alfred P. Sloan Jr.May 3, 1937 – April 2, 1956
Albert BradleyApril 2, 1956 – August 31, 1958
Frederic G. DonnerSeptember 1, 1958 – October 31, 1967
James M. RocheNovember 1, 1967 – December 31, 1971
Richard C. GerstenbergJanuary 1, 1972 – November 30, 1974
Thomas A. MurphyDecember 1, 1974 – December 31, 1980
Roger B. SmithJanuary 1, 1981 – July 31, 1990
Robert C. StempelAugust 1, 1990 – November 1, 1992
John G. SmaleNovember 2, 1992 – December 31, 1995
John F. "Jack" Smith Jr.January 1, 1996 – April 30, 2003
G. Richard Wagoner Jr.May 1, 2003 – March 30, 2009
Kent KresaMarch 30, 2009 – July 10, 2009
Edward ("Ed") Whitacre Jr.July 10, 2009 – December 31, 2010
Dan AkersonDecember 31, 2010 – January 15, 2014
Tim SolsoJanuary 15, 2014 – January 4, 2016
Mary BarraJanuary 4, 2016 – Present

Chief Executive Officers of General Motors
Chief Executive Officers of General Motors
Alfred P. Sloan Jr.May 10, 1923 – June 3, 1946
Charles Erwin WilsonJune 3, 1946 – January 26, 1953
Harlow H. CurticeFebruary 2, 1953 – August 31, 1958
James M. RocheNovember 1, 1967 – December 31, 1971
Richard C. GerstenbergJanuary 1, 1972 – November 30, 1974
Thomas A. MurphyDecember 1, 1974 – December 31, 1980
Roger B. SmithJanuary 1, 1981 – July 31, 1990
Robert C. StempelAugust 1, 1990 – November 1, 1992
John F. "Jack" Smith Jr.November 2, 1992 – May 31, 2000
G. Richard Wagoner Jr.June 1, 2000 – March 30, 2009
Frederick A. "Fritz" HendersonMarch 30, 2009 – December 1, 2009
Edward ("Ed") Whitacre Jr.December 1, 2009 – September 1, 2010
Dan AkersonSeptember 1, 2010 – January 15, 2014 
Mary BarraJanuary 15, 2014 – Present

Vice Chairmen of General Motors
Vice Chairmen of General Motors

Donaldson BrownMay 3, 1937 – June 3, 1946
George RussellNovember 1, 1967 – March 31, 1970
Richard C. GerstenbergApril 6, 1970 – December 31, 1971
Thomas A. MurphyJanuary 1, 1972 – November 30, 1974
Richard L. TerrellOctober 1, 1974 – January 1, 1979
Oscar A. LundinDecember 1, 1974 – November 30, 1975
Howard H. KerhlFebruary 1, 1981 – December 31, 1986
Donald J. AtwoodJune 1, 1987 – April 19, 1989
John F. "Jack" Smith Jr.August 1, 1990 – April 6, 1992
Robert J. SchultzAugust 1, 1990 – November 1, 1992
Harry J. PearceJanuary 1, 1996 – May 25, 2001
John M. DevineJanuary 1, 2001 – June 1, 2006
Robert A. LutzSeptember 1, 2001 – May 1, 2010
Frederick A. "Fritz" HendersonJanuary 1, 2006 – March 3, 2008

Presidents of General Motors
Presidents of General Motors

George E. DanielsSeptember 22, 1908 – October 20, 1908
William M. EatonOctober 20, 1908 – November 23, 1910
James J. StorrowNovember 23, 1910 – January 26, 1911
 Thomas NealJanuary 26, 1911 – November 19, 1912
Charles W. NashNovember 19, 1912 – June 1, 1916
William C. DurantJune 1, 1916 – November 30, 1920
Pierre S. du PontNovember 30, 1920 – May 10, 1923
Alfred P. Sloan Jr.May 10, 1923 – May 3, 1937
William S. KnudsenMay 3, 1937 – September 3, 1940
Charles E. WilsonJanuary 6, 1941 – January 26, 1953
Harlow H. CurticeFebruary 2, 1953 – August 31, 1958
John F. GordonSeptember 1, 1958 – May 31, 1965
James M. RocheJune 1, 1965 – October 31, 1967
Edward N. ColeNovember 1, 1967 – September 30, 1974
Elliott M. EstesOctober 1, 1974 – January 31, 1981
F. James McDonaldFebruary 1, 1981 – August 31, 1987
Robert C. StempelSeptember 1, 1987 – July 31, 1990
Lloyd E. ReussAugust 1, 1990 – April 6, 1992
John F. "Jack" Smith Jr.April 6, 1992 – October 5, 1998
G. Richard Wagoner Jr.October 5, 1998 – March 29, 2009
Frederick A. "Fritz" HendersonMarch 31, 2009 – December 1, 2009
Dan AmmannJanuary 2014 – January 2019 
Mark ReussJanuary 1, 2019

Criticism

Nazi collaboration
In August 1938, before World War Two, a senior executive for General Motors, James D. Mooney, received the Grand Cross of the German Eagle for his distinguished service to the Reich. "Nazi armaments chief Albert Speer told a congressional investigator that Germany could not have attempted its September 1939 Blitzkrieg of Poland without the performance-boosting additive technology provided by Alfred P. Sloan and General Motors". During the war, GM's Opel Brandenburg plant produced trucks, parts for Ju 88 aircraft, land mines and torpedo detonators for Nazi Germany. Charles Levinson, formerly deputy director of the European office of the CIO, alleged in his book, Vodka-Cola extensive collaboration and information sharing between US and German divisions of General Motors during the war.

Sloan's memoir presents a different picture of Opel's wartime existence. According to Sloan, Opel was nationalized (along with most other industrial activity owned or co-owned by foreign interests) by the German state soon after the outbreak of war. Sloan presents Opel at the end of the war as a black box to GM's American management—an organization that the Americans had had no contact with for five years. According to Sloan, GM in Detroit debated whether to even try to run Opel in the postwar era, or to leave to the interim West German government the question of who would pick up the pieces. But Opel was never factually nationalized and the GM-appointed directors and management remained unchanged throughout the war, dealing with other GM companies in Axis and Allied countries including the United States.

In April 1939, defending the German investment strategy as "highly profitable", Alfred P. Sloan had told shareholders that GM's continued industrial production for the Nazi government was merely sound business practice. In a letter to a concerned shareholder, Sloan said that the manner in which the Nazi government ran Germany "should not be considered the business of the management of General Motors....We must conduct ourselves as a German organization.… We have no right to shut down the plant." “In other words, to put the proposition rather bluntly,” Sloan said in the letter, “such matters should not be considered the business of the management of General Motors.”

After 20 years of researching General Motors, Bradford Snell alleged that, "General Motors was far more important to the Nazi war machine than Switzerland ... Switzerland was just a repository of looted funds. GM's Opel division was an integral part of the German war effort. The Nazis could have invaded Poland and Russia without Switzerland. They could not have done so without GM." The day before the German invasion of Poland, which was aided by Nazi soldiers who drove in GM Blitz vehicles, Sloan reportedly told shareholders that GM was “too big” to be impeded by “petty international squabbles.”  However, a letter which Mooney wrote to shareholders in June 1940 confirmed that Nazi Germany had nationalized the Opel plant by this point in time. 

In the summer of 1940, a senior GM executive wrote that “the management of Adam Opel A.G. is in the hands of German nationals,” while also noting that it was still “actively represented by two American executives on the Board of Directors.” In April 1941, Walter Carpenter, a GM board member and vice president of DuPont, advised Sloan, who used South America as a way of keeping business relations with Nazi Germany following U.S. sanctions against the country, to end the business relations, stating "If we don’t listen to the urgings of the State Department in this connection, it seems to me just a question of time ... The effect of this will be to associate the General Motors with Nazi or Fascist propaganda against the interests of the United States ... The effect on the General Motors Corporation might be a very serious matter and the feeling might last for years.” Around this time, Assistant Secretary of State Adolf Berle would successfully urge the FBI to investigate GM. The investigation would find no evidence of disloyalty to American policy, but would also name both Sloan and Mooney in the final report and detail Mooney's ties to Nazi Germany. Mooney, who was in charge of GM's multinational operations, had resigned from the company in 1940.

Great American streetcar scandal theory

The Great American Streetcar Scandal is an unproven theory developed by Robert Eldridge Hicks in 1970 and published by Grossman Publishers in 1973 in the book Politics of Land, Ralph Nader's Study Group Report on Land Use in California at pp. 410–412, compiled by Robert C. Fellmeth, Center for Study of Responsive Law, and put forth by Bradford Snell again in 1974, in which GM, along with road-builders, is alleged to have engaged in a policy that triggered the shift from the mass transportation of the previous century to the 'one-person-one-car' trip of today. The theory states that in order to expand auto sales and maximize profits GM bought local mass transit systems and privately owned railways, following which it would proceed to eliminate them and replace them all with GM-built buses. Alternative versions of the events have been put forth by scholars in the field. Slater, Cosgrove and Span all put forth evidence that counters Snell's theory.

Ralph Nader
Consumer advocate Ralph Nader issued a series of attacks on vehicle safety issues from GM—particularly the Chevrolet Corvair—in his book Unsafe at Any Speed, written in 1965. This first major work undertaken by Nader established his reputation as a crusader for safety. GM was accused of sending spies after him. The company was questioned at a Senate hearing in March 1966 about its attempted intimidation of Nader. Senators Robert Kennedy and Abe Ribicoff questioned CEO James Roche. In the end, the CEO apologized to Nader. The hearings led to legislation which created the United States Department of Transportation and predecessor agencies of the National Highway Traffic Safety Administration later that year. Nader sued GM in November 1966 for invasion of privacy, winning the case on appeal in January, 1970.

Top-level management
In 1980, J. Patrick Wright wrote a book named On a Clear Day You Can See General Motors. This book, which critics acclaimed "blows the lid off the king of carmakers" was about the allegations of corruption, "mismanagement and total irresponsibility" at the top level of the company, as seen by John Z. DeLorean, the Vice-President, who, in 1973, resigned from his position in spite of a brilliant and meteoric rise. He was earning $650,000 per year and was expected to be the next President of GM.

EV1

See also

 Fisher P-75 Eagle
 FM/F2M Wildcat
 F3M Bearcat (none actually built)
 TBM Avenger
 McLaughlin Carriage Company

Notes

References

Bibliography

Works cited

Further reading
 Barabba, Vincent P. Surviving Transformation: Lessons from GM's Surprising Turnaround (2004)
 Chandler, Alfred D. Jr., ed. Giant Enterprise: Ford, General Motors, and the Automobile Industry 1964.
 Cray, Ed. Chrome Colossus: General Motors and Its Times. 1980.
 Farber, David. Sloan Rules: Alfred P. Sloan and the Triumph of General Motors U of Chicago Press 2002
 Gustin, Lawrence R. Billy Durant: Creator of General Motors, 1973.
 Halberstam, David. The Reckoning (1986) detailed reporting on the crises of 1973-mid-1980s
 Keller, Maryann. Rude Awakening: The Rise, Fall, and Struggle for Recovery of General Motors, 1989.
 Leslie, Stuart W. Boss Kettering: Wizard of General Motors Columbia University Press, 1983.
 Maxton, Graeme P. and John Wormald, Time for a Model Change: Re-engineering the Global Automotive Industry (2004)
 Maynard, Micheline. The End of Detroit: How the Big Three Lost Their Grip on the American Car Market (2003)
 Rae, John B. The American Automobile: A Brief History. University of Chicago Press, 1965.
 Weisberger, Bernard A. The Dream Maker: William C. Durant, Founder of General Motors, 1979
 General Motors World 1927, The Historic truth on GM 1927
 Videos

External links
 Official GM website

 
General Motors
General Motors
General Motors
General Motors